Rainard School for Gifted Students is a private school located in Houston, Texas, United States. Rainard serves children in Preschool through 8th grade who are academically gifted.

The Rainard School for Gifted Students is located outside Beltway 8 and north of Interstate 10 in an outlying portion of western Houston in an area known as Spring Branch.

The school 
Rainard was founded by Lorraine Bouchard Ed. D and opened in 1986. After 19 years at its former location at 13922 Old Katy Road, The Rainard School moved to a new four-acre wooded campus at 11059 Timberline in fall 2005. Purchased by Rainard in 2004, the campus was formerly that of The Parish School.

The school was renamed "Rainard School for Gifted Students" in 2010. The school is the only non-profit 501c(3) school in the Houston area totally devoted to gifted students.

In 1996, 2006, and 2015, respectively, it added a middle school, a high school, and a preschool. By 2019 its high school had closed and Rainard was now a K-8 school.

The current Head of School is Dr. Tara Tomicic.  The school is accredited by the Southern Association of Colleges and Schools and has memberships in Houston Association of Independent Schools, National Association of Gifted Children, Texas Association for the Gifted and Talented, Association for Supervision and Curriculum Development, National Association for College Admission Counseling, Texas Association for College Admission Counseling, and College Board.

Curriculum
Gifted students require special individual curricula because of the imbalance between intellectual skills for their age and the social age skills and emotional age skills they possess. If their special needs are not met, these students are subject to various vulnerabilities that can result in the student not realizing his or her full potential or face significant social or emotional challenges.

Classes are multi-age, multi-level to help address their asynchronous development with a given classroom spanning three to four traditional grade levels.  The school has a target of a maximum 10 to 1 student to teacher ratio in the lower school and 9 to 1 in the middle school and high school.  As of 2020, the school's total enrollment is approximately 29 students.

Summer program
Rainard also offers a gifted and talented summer program called Summer Incitement! www.rainard.org for students  years of age through 8th grade.

References

External links

 The Rainard School

Private K–8 schools in Houston
Private K-12 schools in Houston
1986 establishments in Texas
Educational institutions established in 1986